Stephen Bickford (born 27 September 1960) is a former Australian rules footballer who represented the Melbourne Football Club in the Victorian Football League (VFL) during the 1980s.

Son of 1948 Melbourne Premiership player George Bickford, Bickford was named Rookie of the Year in 1980. After a second season of 6 games, he left the club after 1981. He later served on the club's board from 1999 to 2008.

References

1960 births
Living people
Melbourne Football Club players
Australian rules footballers from Victoria (Australia)
People educated at Wesley College (Victoria)